James Robert Shaw  (August 14, 1934 – March 23, 2020) was a Canadian businessman. He founded Alberta-based Shaw Communications in 1966 and was the executive chairman of the company. As of 2016, Shaw and other members of his family controlled 85 percent of the Class A voting shares of Corus Entertainment, and 80 per cent of the class A voting shares of Shaw Communications. Shaw sat on the board of directors of Suncor Energy from 2001 to 2007.

Early years
Shaw was born in 1934 in Brigden, Ontario, the son of Lottie and Francis Shaw, and was raised on his family's farm with his siblings, Les, Bertha and Dolly. The Shaw business dynasty originated in rural Lambton County with Francis Shaw, originally from Kimball, who served in World War I. Francis inherited the family farm, and his brother Joel inherited the grist mill.

Lottie Shaw ran the farm, while Francis, an entrepreneur, slowly built a construction company that became a "major contractor involved in Camp Ipperwash" during World War II. Francis Shaw expanded his businesses into "ready-mix concrete, drive-in theatres, cable television", and a "pipe coating" company—and was an innovator in Ontario.

Education
After Shaw earned his Bachelor of Arts in business administration from Michigan State University, he worked for a while at his father's pipe coating company, Shawcor.

From Ontario to Alberta
Shaw moved to Edmonton in 1961. He was the father of Jim Shaw, who was the chief executive officer of Shaw Communications until his retirement in 2011, and Bradley S. Shaw, the current CEO of Shaw Communications.

In 2002, Shaw legally changed his name from James Robert Shaw to JR Shaw. He died on March 23, 2020, at the age of 85.

Honours 
According to the History of Canadian Broadcasting, in "recognition of his excellence in business and outstanding community involvement", Shaw was made an Officer of the Order of Canada in 2002. He received the Alberta Order of Excellence in 2008.

Shaw received several honorary degrees, including ones from the University of Alberta, University of Calgary, and Graceland University in Lamoni, Iowa.

References

1934 births
2020 deaths
Canadian telecommunications industry businesspeople
Canadian chairpersons of corporations
Canadian chief executives
Canadian mass media owners
Members of the Alberta Order of Excellence
Michigan State University alumni
Officers of the Order of Canada
People from Lambton County